Benjamin Helstad is a Norwegian actor and musician mostly known for King of Devil's Island, Body Troopers and Permafrost. He has also done the Norwegian dubbing for a lot of American films, including Disney's Fillmore, Jungle Cubs and A Bug's Life. He portrayed Adam Solvang in Kielergata (2018).

External links
 

Norwegian male film actors
Year of birth missing (living people)
Living people
Place of birth missing (living people)
Norwegian male musicians
21st-century Norwegian male actors